The first meeting of the Franco–British Nuclear Forum was held in Paris in November 2007, chaired by the Minister for Energy and the French Industry Minister. The working groups are focusing on specific areas for collaboration. A follow-up meeting on the issue in London was planned for March 2008, but did not take place.

See also

Nuclear power in the United Kingdom
Nuclear power in France

External links
BBC: France and UK boost nuclear ties

References

Nuclear energy in the United Kingdom
Nuclear energy in France
France–United Kingdom relations